KSJM (89.1 FM) is a radio station licensed to serve St. James, Minnesota, United States. KSJM broadcasts a Regional Mexican/religious format.
KSJM went silent on September 12, 2014 for technical reasons and a special temporary authority was granted by the FCC. The station resumed operations on November 4, 2015.
In 2016, the station applied for a construction permit to move its transmitter to a neighborhood on the north side of St. James near a church.
KSJM is owned by non-profit Christian Ministries of the Valley, Inc, based out of Weslaco, Texas. The company also owns television stations.

References

External links

Radio stations established in 2011
Watonwan County, Minnesota
2011 establishments in Minnesota
Christian radio stations in Minnesota